A space force is a military branch that conducts space warfare.

Space Force may also refer to:

Arts and entertainment
 Space Force (TV pilot), a 1978 pilot for a television series
 Space Force (BBC radio serial), 1984–1985
 Space Force (TV series), an American comedy TV series
 Space Force: Rogue Universe, a video game
 Space Force, a fictional entity in British TV series Hyperdrive
 Starcom: The U.S. Space Force, a 1987 American animated TV series developed alongside NASA

Military
 United States Space Force, the space service branch of the U.S. Armed Forces
 Russian Space Forces, a branch of the Russian Aerospace Forces
 List of space forces

See also

 Space Command (disambiguation)
 Space Corps (disambiguation)